Yordan Murlev (born 3 May 1960) is a Bulgarian former professional footballer who played as a defender or midfielder.

Honours

Club
CSKA Sofia
Bulgarian Cup: 1987–88

References

External links
Player Profile at levskisofia.info

1960 births
Living people
Bulgarian footballers
OFC Vihren Sandanski players
OFC Pirin Blagoevgrad players
PFC CSKA Sofia players
PFC Levski Sofia players
FC Yantra Gabrovo players
First Professional Football League (Bulgaria) players
Macedonian Bulgarians
Association football defenders
Sportspeople from Blagoevgrad